Hajji Abd ol Vahhab (also Romanized as Ḩājjī ‘Abd ol Vahhāb; also known as Hāj Abdolvāhāb, Ḩājj ‘Abd ol Vahhāb, Qal‘eh-ye Ḩājj Rameẕān, and Ḩājjī Rameẕān) is a village in Gifan Rural District, Garmkhan District, Bojnord County, North Khorasan Province, Iran. At the 2006 census, its population was 477, in 131 families.

References 

Populated places in Bojnord County